Qaleh Jugheh (also Romanized as Qal‘eh Jūgheh; also known as Qal‘eh Jūqeh) is a village in Akhtachi-ye Gharbi Rural District, in the Central District of Mahabad County, West Azerbaijan Province, Iran. At the 2006 census, its population was 162, in 33 families.

References 

Populated places in Mahabad County